Moger is a surname. Notable people with the surname include:

 Calum Von Moger (born 1990), Australian bodybuilder
 Gabriel Móger ( 1379–1439), Majorcan artist
 Harry Moger (1879–1927), English football player
 Philip Moger {born 1955)), British Roman Catholic prelate
 Sandy Moger (born 1969), Canadian ice hockey player